John Wagstaffe (1618–1697), of Ladybellegate House, Longsmith Street, Gloucester, was an English politician.

He was a Member (MP) of the Parliament of England for Gloucester in 1685.

References

1618 births
1697 deaths
People from Gloucester
Members of the Parliament of England (pre-1707) for Gloucester
English MPs 1685–1687